John Madge was an English sociologist and brother of Charles Madge. His book The Tools of Social Science (1953) is a clearly presented and quite readable handbook on research methodology in Sociology and related social sciences. He also wrote The Origins of Scientific Sociology (1959), and a number of books on Urban Sociology.

Born in 1914, Madge was the son of Lieut Col. C. A. Madge and Barbara, née Hylton Foster, and like his father was educated at Winchester College and the University of Cambridge.

The two Madges were active in the Cambridge University Socialist Society.  Cyril Bibby comments with reference to them as well as Maurice Dobb, the twins Francis and Roualeyn Cumming-Bruce, Margot Heinemann and "the beautiful Eileen Wynne" that "it was noticeable how many of these extreme left-wingers came from privileged upper-class homes" (Reminiscences of a Happy Life, p. 171)

Links
 The John Madge Memorial Fund

Year of birth missing
Year of death missing
British sociologists